Sánder Fernández Cervantes (born 19 July 1987) is a Cuban footballer, who plays for Five Islands in Antigua and Barbuda.

Club career
Nicknamed Keko, he played for local provincial side Ciego de Ávila but moved abroad to play for Antiguan side Five Islands alongside compatriots Julio Pichardo, Yoandir Puga, Armando Oramas and Yusvani Caballero and became the league's goalscorer with 14 goals.

In Cuba, he was the league's top goalscorer in 2010, 2015 and 2016.

International career
Fernández made his international debut for Cuba in an October 2010 friendly match against Panama and has earned a total of 12 caps, scoring no goals. He represented his country in 1 FIFA World Cup qualification match.

His final international was a September 2012 World Cup qualifier against Honduras.

Personal life
His brother Reysánder also played for the national team, before defecting to the United States.

References

External links
 

1987 births
Living people
Cuban footballers
Cuba international footballers
Association football forwards
FC Ciego de Ávila players
Five Islands F.C. players
Cuban expatriate footballers
Expatriate footballers in Antigua and Barbuda
Cuban expatriate sportspeople in Antigua and Barbuda
Antigua and Barbuda Premier Division players
People from Morón, Cuba